Park Lake Provincial Park is a provincial park located in Alberta, Canada,  north of Lethbridge.

It was established on November 21, 1932 and is maintained by Alberta Tourism, Parks and Recreation.

Activities
The following activities are available in the park:
Baseball 
Beach activities (sailing and swimming)
Camping
Canoeing and kayaking
Fishing and ice fishing (fish species include burbot, fathead minnow, lake whitefish, longnose sucker, northern pike, spottail shiner, walleye, white sucker and yellow perch)
Front country hiking
Mountain biking

See also
List of provincial parks in Alberta
List of Canadian provincial parks
List of National Parks of Canada

References

External links

Lethbridge County
Provincial parks of Alberta